The 2014 Bluegrass Warhorses season is the first season for the Continental Indoor Football League (CIFL) franchise.

The franchise was first announced in May 2013. Owner Eric Taylor announced that the Warhorses would be playing at the Alltech Arena on the grounds of the Kentucky Horse Park. In July, it was announced the Warhorses would be a member of the Continental Indoor Football League. Harry Lewis was introduced in August as the team's first head coach. In March 2014, the team's financial troubles forced the cancellation of its last four home dates, and moved the league to try to arrange sufficient road dates to allow the team to complete the season.

Roster

Schedule

Regular season

Standings

Coaching staff

References

2014 Continental Indoor Football League season
Bluegrass Warhorses